Stena Freighter may refer to:

 Stena Freighter (1977)
 Stena Freighter (2004)